The 2008 Brown Bears football team was an American football team that represented Brown University during the 2008 NCAA Division I FCS football season. Brown tied for first in the Ivy League. Brown averaged 7,088 fans per game.

In their 12th season under head coach Phil Estes, the Bears compiled a 7–3 record and outscored opponents 269 to 190. Michael Dougherty and Darrell Harrison were the team captains. 

The Bears' 5–1 conference record earned the Ivy League co-championship. Brown outscored Ivy opponents 205 to 105. 

After beating their eventual co-champion, Harvard, the Bears were briefly ranked No. 25 for the first week of October. They lost their next two games, and did not return to the national top 25 for the rest of the year.

Brown played its home games at Brown Stadium in Providence, Rhode Island.

Schedule

References

Brown
Brown Bears football seasons
Ivy League football champion seasons
Brown Bears football